First university in the United States is a status asserted by more than one U.S. university. When the Philippines was still a United States territory, the University of Santo Tomas, which was established in 1611, was considered the oldest university under the American flag. Presently in the United States, there is no official nationwide definition of what entitles an institution to be considered a university versus a college  while differing official definitions are used at the state level, and the common understanding of university has evolved over time.
The 1911 Encyclopædia Britannica describes the gradual emergence of U.S. universities as follows:

The issue is further confused by the fact that at time of founding of many of the institutions in question, the United States didn't exist as a sovereign nation. Moreover, questions of institutional continuity sometimes make it difficult to determine the true "age" of any institution. Furthermore, contesting of the status of first university should not be confused with the contesting of the status of oldest public university in the United States, which is a title claimed by the University of North Carolina at Chapel Hill (first operating), University of Georgia (first chartered), and the College of William & Mary (initially private).

Claimants and potential claimants 
Several universities claim to be the first university in the United States:

Harvard University, founded in 1636, claims to be "the oldest institution of higher education in the United States". The claim of being "the first university" has been made on its behalf by others. An early official mention of Harvard as "the University" is found in the Massachusetts Constitution, first submitted on October 28, 1779, by James Bowdoin, Samuel Adams, and John Adams.
The University of Pennsylvania, which makes a disputed claim to have been established in 1740, considers itself to be America's first university, a title it claims on its website and in other published materials, due to its (1) medical school being established separate from college in 1765 and (2) receiving a revised  charter in 1779 naming it a "University in Philadelphia". The university has published a book about being the first university in America, and its website contains numerous instances of the phrase "America's First University".
The College of William and Mary's website states, "The College of William and Mary was the first college to become a university (1779)."
 Johns Hopkins University opened in 1876 and claims to be "America's first research university" (emphasis added).

Claims of being "the first university in the United States"

Institutional age 
Harvard University calls itself "the oldest institution of higher learning in the United States" and this claim is rarely challenged. It is possible to disagree what year should be taken as Harvard's real founding date. Harvard uses the earliest possible one, 1636, the year in which the Massachusetts General Court resolved to establish a fund in a year's time for a "School or College" to be started, which occurred in 1637 when the Massachusetts Bay Colony issued Harvard a charter.). However, Harvard has operated since 1650 under the same corporation, the "President and Fellows of Harvard College"; as such, it has an unbroken institutional history dating back to the mid seventeenth century.

The University of Pennsylvania claims to be the first university in America, drawing a distinction between this and the first college: "In the Anglo-American model, a college, by definition, is a faculty whose subject specialization is in a single academic field. This is usually arts and sciences (often referred to as 'liberal arts'), but may also be one of the professions: law, medicine, theology, etc. A university, by contrast, is the co-existence, under a single institutional umbrella, of more than one faculty. With the founding of the first medical school in America (in 1765; Columbia was second), Penn became America's first university."

William & Mary calls itself "the second oldest institution of higher learning in the country", acknowledging Harvard's claim but adding that: "Harvard may have opened first, but William & Mary was already planned. Original 1619 plans for W&M called for a campus at Henrico." This refers to the College of Henricopolis or University of Henrico established by the Virginia Company near Richmond, Virginia. With respect to the title of first university in America, it makes the claim on its website that "in 1781, by uniting the faculties of law, medicine, and the arts, William & Mary became America's first true university." Elsewhere on the website, it also claims to be the "First institution of higher education to have a law school, which made us the first college in the country to become a university (1779)".

Official designation as a "university"

University of Pennsylvania 
The University of Pennsylvania claims that the (a) 1779 charter from the Pennsylvania state legislature, establishing the "University"  in Philadelphia and (b) passing of a 1785 law naming the "University of the State of Pennsylvania"  allows Penn to assert that "No other American institution of higher learning was named "University "  before Penn was so named."

The newly–designated university was intended to continue the College of Philadelphia, established by Benjamin Franklin and chartered in 1755 alongside an academy chartered in 1753. However, the Pennsylvania legislature in 1779 suspected the provost of the College of Philadelphia, William Smith, and the existing board of trustees of loyalist sympathies. They therefore created a new board for the university, taking over the old college and academy. Following protests by Smith and the trustees of the college, the legislature reinstated the college's 1753 and 1755 charters in 1789 and the college regained possession of its buildings, with the university moving to the Philosophical Society Hall. This arrangement lasted two years before, following the adoption of a new constitution by the state, a new charter in 1791 merged the College of Philadelphia and the University of the State of Pennsylvania, forming the University of Pennsylvania.

William and Mary 
On December 4, 1779, just seven days after the founding of the "University of the State of Pennsylvania", an event occurred which the College of William & Mary describes thus:

(For historical reasons, The College of William & Mary, like Dartmouth College and Boston College, has continued to use "college" rather than "university" in its official name.)

In 2020, William and Mary law professor Thomas McSweeney along with two undergraduate students published an article in the William and Mary Law Review pointing out that the Latin text of the university's 1693 royal charter referred to the institution as a studium generale, translated in the English text by the relatively insignificant "place of universal study". They argue that by creating the institution as a studium generale, which was the technical term used for a university in the middle ages, William and Mary was granted the status of a university in its 1693 charter. The same phrase was noted by Jurgen Herbst in 1982, who said: "The charter used the Latin term studium generale to suggest possible growth into a full-fledged university". Edward Eggleston in 1900 noted that: "[the English text of the charter] is printed with Harwell, Blair and Clinton's account of Virginia, and the copy of the latter in the Library of Congress is annotated by some critic, who notes slight variations on the sense of the English version of the charter from the Latin original. The phrase 'studium generale' has a sense hardly appreciated by those who copied it from the ancient charter for William and Mary."

Harvard 
The Constitution of Massachusetts, submitted by James Bowdoin, Samuel Adams, and John Adams to the full Convention on October 28, 1779 and ratified on June 15, 1780, contains this language:
Chapter V. The University at Cambridge, and Encouragement of Literature, etc.

Section I. The University.

Art. I.--Whereas our wise and pious ancestors, so early as the year one thousand six hundred and thirty six, laid the foundation of Harvard-College, in which University many persons of great eminence have, by the blessing of GOD, been initiated in those arts and sciences, which qualified them for public employments, both in Church and State: And whereas the encouragement of Arts and Sciences, and all good literature, tends to the honor of God, the advantage of the christian religion, and the great benefit of this, and the other United States of America--It is declared, That the PRESIDENT AND FELLOWS OF HARVARD-COLLEGE, in their corporate capacity, and their successors in that capacity, their officers and servants, shall have, hold, use, exercise and enjoy, all the powers, authorities, rights, liberties, privileges, immunities and franchises, which they now have, or are entitled to have, hold, use, exercise and enjoy: And the same are hereby ratified and confirmed unto them, the said President and Fellows of Harvard-College, and to their successors, and to their officers and servants, respectively, forever.

The word "university" is used a total of five times in reference to Harvard in the Massachusetts Constitution.

(It is not clear from context, either above or in the paragraphs that follow, that the constitution meant to draw any semantic distinction between "college" and "university.")

In George Washington's honorary Doctor of Laws degree, conferred by Harvard on April 30, 1776, the text of the degree refers to Harvard twice as "our University".

Issuing doctoral degrees 
If a university is defined as an institution that awards doctoral degrees, then there are a number of contenders for the title of oldest United States university based on that criterion, as well. Among the conflicting interpretations is whether the date the first doctoral degree is awarded should be the determining factor, or the date a doctoral program was first attempted is the determinant.

Harvard University 
Harvard University has awarded honorary "doctorates" since the 17th century, such as the Doctor of Sacred Theology degree to Increase Mather in 1692 (the first honorary degree in the New World).

University of Pennsylvania 
University of Pennsylvania founded the first medical school in America in 1765, according to Penn's archivist.

Columbia University 
King's College (now Columbia University) organized a medical faculty in 1767, and in 1769 became the first institution in the North American Colonies to confer the degree of Doctor of Medicine, according to the College of Physicians and Surgeons.

Yale University 
Yale's website refers to the establishment of "the Graduate School of Arts and Sciences" in 1847.

Georgetown University 
Georgetown's website references 1820 as the year it first established its graduate school, issuing its first advanced degree in 1820.

Issuance of Ph. D. degree

Yale University 
Yale's website states that in 1861, Yale "awarded the first Ph.D. in the United States".

See also 
Colonial colleges
List of oldest universities in continuous operation
Oldest public university in the United States

Notes

References 

History of the Thirteen Colonies
History of universities and colleges in the United States
Lists of universities and colleges in the United States